Osterwalder is a Swiss surname.

Notable people with this surname include:
 Adolf Osterwalder (1872-1961), Swiss zymologist and bacteriologist
 Alexander Osterwalder (born 1974), Swiss business theorist
 Konrad Osterwalder (born 1942), Swiss mathematician and physicist